R. nigricans may refer to:
 Rhizopus nigricans, the breadmold, a harmless mold species known to grow on bread
 Russula nigricans, the blackening brittlegill or blackening russula, a gilled mushroom species found in woodland in Europe

See also
 Nigricans (disambiguation)